Pireneitega ovtchinnikovi is an araneomorph spider species found in Russia, Abkhazia and Georgia.

References

Agelenidae
Spiders of Europe
Spiders of Asia
Spiders described in 2013